The McDonnell XH-20 Little Henry was a 1940s American experimental lightweight helicopter designed and built by McDonnell Aircraft.

Development
The McDonnell Model 38 was a lightweight experimental helicopter sponsored by the United States Army Air Force to test the concept of using small ramjets at the tips of the rotor blades. As a functional helicopter it was a simple open-frame steel-tube construction. Allotted the military designation XH-20 the first of two first flew on the 29 August 1947.

Although the XH-20 flew successfully the ramjets were noisy and burnt a large amount of fuel and plans to build a larger two-seat XH-29 were abandoned.

Variants
Data from: U.S.Military Aircraft Designations and Serials since 1909
XH-29
XH-20
McDonnell Model 38experimental lightweight helicopter, two built.
McDonnell Model 79a proposed two-seat development, cancelled.

Operator

United States Air Force

Aircraft on display

46-689 the first XH-20 is on display at the National Museum of the United States Air Force

Specifications

See also

References

H-020 Little Henry
1940s United States helicopters
1940s United States experimental aircraft
Aircraft first flown in 1947
Tipjet-powered helicopters